VBK may refer to:

Butch van Breda Kolff, an American basketball player and coach
Jan van Breda Kolff, an American basketball player and coach, son of Butch van Breda Kolff
John Vanbiesbrouck, an American hockey goaltender
VBK-Raduga, a reentry capsule that was used for returning materials from the Mir space station
Veen Bosch & Keuning, Dutch publishing house
Verkehrsbetriebe Karlsruhe, the municipal transport company of the city of Karlsruhe in Germany
Vetlanda BK, Swedish professional bandy club founded in 1945.